Sergei Valentinovich Rekhtin (born 12 September 1974 in Barnaul) is a Russian football coach and a former player.

References

1974 births
Sportspeople from Barnaul
Living people
Russian footballers
FC Dynamo Barnaul players
FC Tom Tomsk players
Russian Premier League players
Russian football managers
Association football defenders